John Henry Bickford Waite (19 January 1930 – 22 June 2011) was a South African cricketer who played in fifty Tests from 1951 to 1965.

He was born in Johannesburg, Transvaal, and educated at Hilton College and Rhodes University. He was the first South African to play 50 Tests for his country and is generally acknowledged to be one of South Africa's finest wicket keepers. His total of 141 dismissals in Test matches stood as a record for his country until it was overtaken by Dave Richardson.  In 1953–54 he set a new Test best of 23 dismissals in a single series, against New Zealand and broke his own record in 1961–62, with 26, also against New Zealand.  He was also a solid batsman, scoring 76 on debut against England at Trent Bridge, and averaging over 30 in Tests with four Test centuries.

In addition to his Test career, he played first class cricket for Eastern Province and Transvaal, making his debut in 1948 and retiring in 1966.  His highest first class score was 219 for Eastern Province against Griqualand West.

References

External links
 

1930 births
2011 deaths
Eastern Province cricketers
Gauteng cricketers
South African Universities cricketers
South Africa Test cricketers
South African cricketers
Alumni of Hilton College (South Africa)
Cricketers from Johannesburg
Wicket-keepers